Relin Sosa Athletic Track is an athletic track in Cabo Rojo, Puerto Rico.  It hosted some of the football events for the 2010 Central American and Caribbean Games.

References

2010 Central American and Caribbean Games venues
Cabo Rojo, Puerto Rico